Fernando Morales (born February 4, 1982, in San Juan) is a volleyball player from Puerto Rico, who was a member of the Men's National Team that ended in second place at the 2007 Pan-American Cup in Santo Domingo, Dominican Republic. There he was named Best Setter of the tournament, the same title he won in the 2009 edition of the same event. He won with his team the bronze medal at the 2010 Pan-American Cup. He is the son of Puerto Rican basketball legend Mario Morales and volleyball legend Eva Lopez, and the nephew of the also legendary basketball player Federico Lopez.

Clubs
  Playeros de San Juan (2000)
  Caribes San Sebastian (2001–2002)
  Criollos de Caguas  (2003–2005)
  Probisa Málaga (2004–2005)
  Patriotas de Lares (2006)
  HYPO VBK Klagenfurt (2005–2006)
  Hypo Tirol Innsbruck (2006–2007)
  GFCO Ajaccio (2007–2008)
  Plataneros de Corozal  (2008)
  Aon hotVolleys Vienna (2008–2009)
  Plataneros de Corozal (2009–2010)
  AEK Karavas (2010–2011)
  AEK Karavas (2011–2012)
  Plataneros de Corozal (2012)
  Enisey Krasnoyarsk (2013–2014)

Awards

Individuals
 2007 Pan-American Cup "Best Setter"
 2008,2009,2010 Puerto Rican league "Best Setter"
 2008,2010 Puerto Rican League "Best Server"
 2008 Puerto Rican League "MVP"
 2009 Pan-American Cup "Best Setter"

Clubs
 2008, 2009/2010 Liga de Voleibol Superior Masculino – , Champion with Plataneros de Corozal

References

External links
 FIVB profile

1982 births
Living people
Puerto Rican men's volleyball players
Volleyball players at the 2007 Pan American Games
Sportspeople from San Juan, Puerto Rico
Puerto Rican expatriate sportspeople in Russia
Pan American Games competitors for Puerto Rico